The Gasunie Building is one of the most famous buildings in Groningen, Netherlands. It was built as a headquarters for Gasunie and was officially opened on 22 April 1994 by Queen Beatrix of the Netherlands. It is in the south of the city, on the edge of the Stadspark and right next to the main highways.

History
The old Gasunie building facilities could not meet the needs of growing number of the employees. After evaluation of economic and practical issues, it was decided to build a new building was made. The project started in 1989 with selecting a suitable site and creating a list of requirements, which architects should have implemented in their proposals.

Architecture

The design of the building was developed by Alberts and Van Huut architects bureau and is considered to be a great example of ‘organic building’. There are two distinct parts in the building: high-rise section with offices and low-rise section with meeting rooms and service facilities. The floors of the building are visually linked by this glass wall, which creates a sense of unity and space.

References

External links

Gasunie-gebouw
- Newspaper ″Trouw″ 2007 -Most beautiful building in Groningen-

Office buildings completed in 1994
Buildings and structures in Groningen (city)
Towers in Groningen (province)
1994 establishments in the Netherlands
20th-century architecture in the Netherlands